Albano Olivetti and David Vega Hernández were the defending champions but only Olivetti chose to defend his title, partnering Hunter Reese. Olivetti lost in the quarterfinals to Anirudh Chandrasekar and Arjun Kadhe.

Sadio Doumbia and Fabien Reboul won the title after defeating Chandrasekar and Kadhe 6–2, 6–4 in the final.

Seeds

Draw

References

External links
 Main draw

Open Quimper Bretagne - Doubles
2023 Doubles